Gola ( or Oileán Ghabhla) is a small island off the coast of Gweedore, County Donegal, Ireland.
The island was unpopulated as recently as 1996 but in recent years people have started to return. A ferry service operates during the holiday season and on request for the remainder of the year.

Description
Its many beaches and secluded bays attract visitors throughout the year. The island was populated up until the mid-1960s. Today most of the buildings on the island are derelict, but some have been renovated as holiday homes and the island is now inhabited for most of the year.

The island terrain is mildly hilly with many bog road and sheep paths. At present, during the winter the only inhabitants on Gola are animals. Sheep and some shy goats tend to reside along the cliffs. To the back of the island, seabirds are numerous, with cormorants, shags, razorbills, guillemots as well as the odd passing gannet and skua. At the southern end of the near Port na Crin and the old school house, many shore species of bird can be admired such as the eider, oystercatcher, divers and various species of tern.

Gola is the birthplace of renowned Irish writer, Seán 'ac Fhionnlaoich. The island has also been immortalised in the traditional children's song Báidín Fheilimí ("Feilimí's Little Boat") .

Before 2005, there was no mains electricity available on the island, all dwellings relying on generators, oil lamps and renewable power sources such as solar and wind.

Demographics
The table below reports data on Gola's population taken from Discover the Islands of Ireland (Alex Ritsema, Collins Press, 1999) and the Census of Ireland.

Media depictions
RTÉ offended viewers by depicting a dog having its legs tied together and being tossed overboard into the sea off the coast of Gola Island as part of its TV50 celebrations in a broadcast on 3 January 2012.

Radio na Gaeltachta reported that Donegal County Council has begun a planning investigation into major planning breaches on the island. Mobile homes have been illegally placed on the island along with other building regulation breaches. Those affected were notified of the breaches.

Gallery

See also

 List of islands of Ireland
 Inishmeane
 Báidín Fheilimí

References
 Alan Tees (editor), Rock Climbs in Donegal (Mountaineering Council of Ireland, 2002)

External links

Historical Map of Gola Island
Ireland: Rediscovering Gola
Rock Climbing guide to Gola

Climbing areas of Ireland
Gaeltacht places in County Donegal
Geography of Gweedore
Islands of County Donegal